Jalan Tengku Omar, or Jalan Kompleks Sukan, Federal Route 216 (formerly Terengganu state route T216), is a federal road in Kuala Nerus, Terengganu, Malaysia. The Kilometre Zero of the Federal Route 216 starts at Jalan Tengku Ampuan Intan Zaharah junctions.

At most sections, the Federal Route 216 was built under the JKR R5 road standard, allowing maximum speed limit of up to 90 km/h.

List of junctions and towns

References

Kuala Nerus District
Malaysian Federal Roads